Brett Dickinson (born December 4, 1962) is a former American professional tennis player.

Biography
Dickinson was born in Atlanta, Georgia but grew up in Las Vegas, Nevada. He studied mathematics at San Jose State University in the early 1980s and played collegiate tennis, before turning professional.

His greatest achievement on tour was reaching the doubles final of the 1985 Melbourne Outdoor, a Grand Prix tournament, with Roberto Saad. The pair were defeated in the final by local pairing Darren Cahill and Peter Carter.

As a singles player he reached the quarter-finals at Auckland in 1986 and the following year won the Enugu Challenger tournament in Nigeria. He came close to upsetting Pat Cash at the 1987 WCT Tournament of Champions. He was 5–2 up in the third and deciding set before the Australian came back to win by claiming the final five games.

He competed in the main draw of the men's doubles events at the Australian Open, French Open and US Open.

For much of his tennis career he was based in Paris, France. He is now back in the United States and works as a realtor in La Jolla.

Grand Prix career finals

Doubles: 1 (0–1)

Challenger titles

Singles: (1)

Doubles: (2)

References

External links
 
 

1962 births
Living people
American male tennis players
Tennis people from Nevada
San Jose State Spartans men's tennis players